Cyanoketone, also known as 2α-cyano-4,4',17α-trimethylandrost-5-en-17β-ol-3-one (CTM), is a synthetic androstane steroid and a steroidogenesis inhibitor which is used in scientific research. On account of its structural similarity to pregnenolone, cyanoketone binds to and acts as a potent, selective, and irreversible inhibitor of 3β-hydroxysteroid dehydrogenase (3β-HSD), an enzyme that is responsible for the conversion of pregnenolone into progesterone, 17α-hydroxypregnenolone into 17α-hydroxyprogesterone,  into androstenedione, and androstenediol into testosterone. As such, cyanoketone inhibits the production of both gonadal and adrenal steroids, including progesterone, androgens, estrogens, and corticosteroids. The drug is too toxic for therapeutic use in humans, and so has been used instead exclusively as a research tool.

See also 
 Azastene

References 

3β-Hydroxysteroid dehydrogenase inhibitors
Abandoned drugs
Tertiary alcohols
Androstanes
Cholesterol side-chain cleavage enzyme inhibitors
CYP17A1 inhibitors
Ketones
Nitriles